Elisha Voren is a former International level competitor in the sport of Taekwondo. She was born in Miami, Florida on October 7, 1980. In 2003, she earned a bronze medal in the World Taekwondo Championships. She also competed in the 2000 Olympic trials for Taekwondo. She has additionally competed as a crossfit athlete.

References

American female taekwondo practitioners
World Taekwondo Championships medalists
Year of birth missing (living people)
Living people
21st-century American women